Apollonia was a city of ancient Crete, near Knossos, the inhabitants of which were most treacherously treated by the Cydoniatae, who were their friends and allies. The editors of the Barrington Atlas of the Greek and Roman World place Apollonia at Gazi.

The site of Apollonia is near the modern Gazi.

See also
 List of ancient Greek cities

References

Cretan city-states
Ancient Greek archaeological sites in Crete
Populated places in ancient Crete
Former populated places in Greece